Life Image is a medical evidence and image exchange network providing access to points of care and curated imaging data. Founded in 2008, Life Image's Interoperability Suite is a digital platform that uses vendor-agnostic integration standards to connect facilities, providers, clinics, and patients with life sciences, medical devices, and telehealth companies.

Network Statistics
 13,000 connection points in the U.S.
 160,000 providers connected 
 58,000 global providers 
 12+ million clinical encounters per month 
 7 billion image files exchanged

Company growth
Outside of its historical hospital network centered in academic medical centers, the company now has a number of other healthcare sectors on the Life Image network:

Telehealth (in both teleradiology and care coordination)
Health plans
Physicians and small physician groups
Imaging centers 
Life sciences
Artificial intelligence
Clinical research
Direct to consumer and consumer sponsored application

A Growing Partner Network
In November 2017, Life Image announced a partnership with Google Cloud Platform to develop novel solutions in artificial intelligence and machine learning.

References

Medical imaging